The 1939 Hythe by-election was a parliamentary by-election held on 20 July 1939 for the British House of Commons constituency of Hythe.

Previous MP 
The vacancy was caused by the death of the Conservative MP, Sir Philip Sassoon, 3rd Baronet.

Previous result

Candidates 
The Conservatives selected a London County Councillor, Rupert Brabner, to defend the seat. 
Hythe was not one of the Liberal Party's better prospects. They drafted a new candidate for the by-election: 33-year-old Frank Darvall, who had been selected as the prospective candidate for the more winnable Dorset East. He had been the Liberal candidate for the Ipswich Division of Suffolk at the 1929 general election and for the King’s Lynn Division of Norfolk at the 1935 general election. He was President of the National Union of Students from 1927–29. 
As in the 1935 general election campaign, the Hythe Labour Party chose not to run a candidate. However, a former Labour party member did contest the election: St John Philby stood as a candidate for the newly formed British People's Party, a right-wing anti-war party that broke away from the British Union of Fascists.

Result

Aftermath 
Rupert Brabner served as a junior Government Minister. He died on active service with the RNVR early in 1945. 
Frank Darvall had planned to contest Hythe at a 1939 or 1940 general election, but never stood for Parliament again. 
St. John Philby also disappeared from the electoral scene along with the British People's Party, which never contested an election again.

References

1939 elections in the United Kingdom
1939 in England
By-elections to the Parliament of the United Kingdom in Kent constituencies
Folkestone and Hythe District
1930s in Kent